Goriparthi Narasimha Raju Yadav is an Indian farmer, known for his achievements in agricultural farming. 
Hailing from the Guduru village, in Krishna district, in the south Indian state of Andhra Pradesh, he is reported to have recorded harvests such as 7.5 to 8.3 tonnes of Pusa Basmati 1 rice per hectare, 3 tonnes of black gram per hectare, and 4 to 5 tonnes of groundnut per hectare. He is also known to have grown a horsegram creeper with over 10,000 branches and a mango tree in his farm yielded 22,000 mangoes in a single season. He has been associated with the expert committees of the Indian Rice Development Council (IRDC) and the Indian Council of Agricultural Research (ICAR) as a member and is a recipient of several awards including Krishaka Ratna, Krishi Ratna, Krishi Samrat and the Jagjivan Ram Kisan Puraskar (1999) of the Indian Council of Agricultural Research. The Government of India awarded him the fourth highest civilian honour of the Padma Shri, in 2009, for his contributions to agriculture.

References 

Recipients of the Padma Shri in science & engineering
Year of birth missing (living people)
People from Krishna district
Scientists from Andhra Pradesh
Indian Council of Agricultural Research
Indian farmers
Indian agriculturalists
Living people
Businesspeople from Andhra Pradesh